Casteldelci is a comune (municipality) in the Province of Rimini in the Italian region Emilia-Romagna, located about  southeast of Bologna and about  south of Rimini.

History 
After the referendum of 17 and 18 December 2006, Casteldelci was detached from the Province of Pesaro and Urbino (Marche) to join Emilia-Romagna and the Province of Rimini on 15 August 2009.

Personalities
It is the birthplace of the condottiero Uguccione della Faggiola, member of the family who ruled here in the Middle Ages. Later Casteldelci was a possession of  the House of Montefeltro and the Medici.

References

Cities and towns in Emilia-Romagna